Adele Gerard Lewis Grant (June 3, 1881 - June 19, 1969) was an American feminist, botanist, teacher, taxonomist, curator, and explorer.

Career 
In 1903, she obtained a B.Sc. in botany from the University of California at Berkeley. She continued with her studies, gaining an M.Sc. and Ph.D. in botany from Washington State University. Before her move to South Africa, she taught at the Missouri Botanical Garden and Cornell University.

At Cornell, she started and served as the first president for the Sigma Delta Epsilon Graduate Women's Scientific Fraternity.

In 1925, she moved to South Africa to teach botany at the Huguenot Faculty in Wellington, South Africa, while collecting plants in countries such as Congo, Democratic Republic, Mozambique, South Africa, and Zimbabwe.

She returned to the United States in 1930, returning also to the Missouri Botanical Garden. She then moved to continue her research at the University of California, Los Angeles. Her specific focus included genera Mimulus and Hemimeris L.

Honors 
 1901: Co-founded the Prytanean Society with Agnes Frisius on the campus of the University of Berkeley, with advisor Mary Bennett Ritter The Sigma Delta Epsilon Adele Lewis Grant Fellowship was named in her honor.

References 

Cornell University faculty
1881 births
1969 deaths
University of California, Berkeley alumni
Place of birth missing
Place of death missing
20th-century American botanists
American women botanists
Washington State University alumni
Missouri Botanical Garden people
University of California, Los Angeles staff
American women academics
20th-century American women scientists